is a multinational Japanese chemical company. Its main products are chemicals and materials science.

It was founded in May 1931, using the paid in capital of  Nobeoka Ammonia Fiber Co., Ltd, a Nobeoka, Miyazaki based producer of ammonia, nitric acid, and other chemicals.  Now headquartered in Tokyo, with offices and plants across Japan, as well as China, Singapore, Thailand, U.S.A. and Germany.

The company is listed on the first section of Tokyo Stock Exchange and is a constituent of the TOPIX 100 and Nikkei 225 stock market indices.

History 
The company Asahi Kasei began in the year 1931 with the production of chemicals that included ammonia and nitric acids. In 1949, exchanges between stocks started up between Tokyo, Osaka, and Nagoya. Asahi Kasei entered into a joint petrochemical venture with Dow Chemical. A production of Polystyrene and Saran Wrap began in 1952. Diversification into acrylonitrile, construction materials, petrochemicals, glass fabrics, ethylene, housing, medical devices, electronics, engineered resins, semiconductors, pharmaceuticals and liquors began in the 1960s and 1990s. Net sales exceeded $10 billion globally in the years 2000–2003. Finally, in the years 2008–2009, there was further diversification into medical devices. In 2018, Asahi Kasei acquired Sage Automotive Interiors.

Asahi Kasei subsidiary Polypore and Celgard inked a significant global strategic partnership agreement with USA based company C4V to foster high voltage battery separators, part of which Asahi Kasei also plan to work with C4V to deploy large scale manufacturing Gigafactories in different locations across the globe

Statistics 
The company makes about 18 billion dollars globally in annual net sales. Their core operating segments include:
 Chemicals (43.4%)
 Homes (27.2%)
 Healthcare (7.95%)
 Fibers (7%)
 Electronics (10%)
 Construction materials (3.3%)
 Services, engineering, and others (1.2%)

Locations 
As of March 2022, Asahi Kasei currently employs 46,751 people  and have a total of 54 manufacturing facilities found in different areas all over the world. Some of these places include North America, Europe, South Asia, East Asia, and Japan.

Their operations in North America are located in Alabama, California, Illinois, Kentucky, Michigan, New York, New Jersey, North Carolina, Massachusetts, and Mexico. In Europe it has sites in Austria, Belgium, Czech Republic, France, Germany, Italy, Netherlands, Poland, Romania, Spain, Sweden, and United Kingdom. The sites in Japan are located in Tokyo, Kawasaki, Nobeoka, and Mizushima. The sites in South and East Asia operate in India, Suzhou, Shanghai, Thailand, and Singapore.

Business segments and products
The main operations of the company are divided into the following four business sectors:
 Chemicals & fibers
 Chemicals
 Polymer products
 Specialty chemicals
 Fibers
 Homes & construction materials
 Foundation systems
 Insulation materials
 AAC-related products
 Structural materials
 Order-built homes
 Real estate–related operations
 Building remodeling
 Electronics
 LSIs
 Hall effect elements, magnetometers and Hall ICs
 Clean energy materials
 Optical and printing materials
 Electronic materials
 Health care
 Blood transfusion devices
 Blood purification devices
 Bioprocess products: leukocyte reduction filters, virus removal filters
 Orthopedics and urology pharmaceuticals
 Critical care devices: defibrillators, wearable defibrillators, automated CPR systems, temperature management systems, data solutions
 Diagnostic reagents
 Nutritional products

References

External links

Asahi Kasei Corporation Website 
  Wiki collection of bibliographic works on Asahi Kasei

Chemical companies based in Tokyo
Companies listed on the Tokyo Stock Exchange
Chemical companies established in 1931
Conglomerate companies of Japan
Defense companies of Japan
Mizuho Financial Group
Conglomerate companies established in 1931
Japanese companies established in 1931
Japanese brands